This is the discography of German power metal band Blind Guardian.

Albums

Studio albums

Live albums

Compilation albums

Singles

Demos

Tribute albums

Other

Videography

DVDs

Music videos

References

Heavy metal group discographies
Discographies of German artists